Program Playhouse was an anthology television series aired on the DuMont Television Network on Wednesdays from June 22 to September 14, 1949.

The first program starred Ernest Truex as Caspar Milquetoast in The Timid Soul. Others appearing included Earl Hammond in Trouble, Inc, and Roscoe Karns in Roscoe Karns and Inky Poo.

Episode status
As with most DuMont series, no episodes are known to exist.

See also
List of programs broadcast by the DuMont Television Network
List of surviving DuMont Television Network broadcasts

References

Bibliography
David Weinstein, The Forgotten Network: DuMont and the Birth of American Television (Philadelphia: Temple University Press, 2004) 
Alex McNeil, Total Television, Fourth edition (New York: Penguin Books, 1980) 
Tim Brooks and Earle Marsh, The Complete Directory to Prime Time Network TV Shows, Third edition (New York: Ballantine Books, 1964)

External links
Program Playhouse at IMDB
DuMont historical website

DuMont Television Network original programming
1949 American television series debuts
1949 American television series endings
1940s American television series
Black-and-white American television shows